Jagdish Singh may refer to:

 Jagdish Singh (boxer), Indian boxer and boxing coach 
 Jagdish Singh (skier) (born 1991), Indian cross-country skier
 Jagdish Singh (badminton) (born 1993), Malaysian badminton player
 Jagdish Prasad Singh, Indian writer